Heliophanus lawrencei is a jumping spider species in the genus Heliophanus.  It was first described by Wanda Wesołowska in 1986 and lives in Angola and Democratic Republic of the Congo.

References

Salticidae
Spiders described in 1986
Arthropods of Angola
Fauna of the Democratic Republic of the Congo
Spiders of Africa
Taxa named by Wanda Wesołowska